Hàm Thuận Nam is a rural district of Bình Thuận province in the Southeast region of Vietnam.

As of 2003, the district had a population of 91,114. The district covers an area of 1,052 km². The district capital lies at Thuận Nam.

References

Districts of Bình Thuận province